The following highways are numbered 783:

United States